Barberousse is a 1917 silent French film directed by Abel Gance.

Cast
 Léon Mathot as Trively
 Émile Keppens as Gesmus
 Maud Richard as Odette Trively
 Germaine Pelisse as Pauline
 Yvonne Briey
 Henri Maillard
 Doriani
 Paul Vermoyal

References

External links

1917 films
1910s French-language films
French black-and-white films
Films directed by Abel Gance
French silent feature films
1910s French films